The Bride and the Beast is a 1958 American horror film produced and directed by Adrian Weiss. The film's screenplay was co-written by Ed Wood, based on a story by Weiss. Wood's original working title was Queen of the Gorillas.

Plot
Dan Fuller, a big game hunter, is forced to kill his pet gorilla when it attempts to rape his new bride Laura. The woman starts to experience strange urgings following the encounter, and submits to hypnosis under the care of a psychiatrist. She reveals to her shocked husband that she was actually a gorilla in a previous life. Slowly she reverts to her former bestial self, and winds up eloping into the jungle with a male ape, with her cuckolded husband staring helplessly after them.

Cast
 Charlotte Austin as Laura Carson Fuller 
 Lance Fuller as Dan Fuller
 Johnny Roth as Taro, the houseboy
 William Justine as Dr. Carl Reiner
 Gil Frye as Captain Cameron
 Jeanne Gerson as Marka, the cook
 Trustin Howard as the soldier
 Eve Brent as the stewardess
 Bhogwan Singh as the native killed by tiger in a hut

Production
Ed Wood was inspired by the real-life Bridey Murphy story currently in the headlines, and worked stock jungle animal footage from a Sabu movie into the storyline.

Mark Thomas McGee said that Weiss told him that he considered the film "a minor classic", while lead actress Charlotte Austin commented on the incredible cheapness, using one of Weiss's relatives to physically turn the wheels of the stationary truck the actors were sitting in, to make it appear the vehicle was moving.

Release
The Bride and the Beast opened in San Diego on January 29, 1958.

References

External links
 
 The Bride and the Beast at PizzaFLIX via license from Kit Parker Films

1958 films
1950s English-language films
American supernatural horror films
Allied Artists films
Films about gorillas
1950s American films